Bryan Mattison (born May 15, 1984) is an American football center who is currently a free agent. He was signed by the New York Jets as an undrafted free agent in 2008, and has also been a member of the Baltimore Ravens, St. Louis Rams, and the Kansas City Chiefs.  He played college football as a defensive end at Iowa.

Mattison is the son of football coach Greg Mattison. Sister to the two-time Clinton Classic Mixed Division Champion, Lisa 'Mattison' Roberts.

Early years
Mattison was born in Kalamazoo, Michigan, during his father's employment as an assistant football coach with Western Michigan University.  Due to the nature of his father's profession, the Mattison family moved several times in Bryan's youth, living in Michigan, Maryland, Texas, Michigan again, and Indiana.  Mattison graduated from Penn High School in Mishawaka, Indiana while his father was serving as an assistant at nearby Notre Dame.

While at Penn High School, Mattison was named one of the top 50 players in the State of Indiana by the Indiana Football Coaches Association and was also an Associated Press first-team all-state selection. As a senior, he collected 70 tackles, seven sacks and 16 tackles for loss en route to leading his team to a Class 5-A sectional championship. He was a two-year starter and also led his rugby union team to a state championship.  He played in the 2003 U.S. Army All-American Bowl alongside fellow Iowa Hawkeye Drew Tate.  Despite his father's presence on the Notre Dame staff, Mattison was not offered a scholarship to play for the Fighting Irish.  Instead, he chose Iowa over offers from Colorado, Illinois, and Indiana.

College career
After redshirting in 2003, Mattison played in all 12 games for the Hawkeyes in 2004. In limited playing time, he collected five tackles, one tackle for loss and one pass breakup.

Starting in all 12 games in 2005, Mattison amassed 46 tackles, 10 tackles for loss, four sacks, one pass breakup and one fumble recovery. His game against Indiana might have been his best, as he had a career-high nine tackles along with two tackles for loss, one sack and one pass breakup. Mattison also had three tackles against Minnesota as the Hawkeyes held the top rushing team in the nation to only 129 rushing yards.

As a junior in 2006, Mattison he recorded 59 tackles, seven sacks, 11 tackles for loss, six pass breakups, four forced fumbles and one fumble recovery. The game against Ohio State was one of his best, as he recorded eight tackles and one forced fumble. He also performed well against Michigan, recording five tackles, two sacks and a forced fumble as the Hawkeyes lost to the number two team in the nation. Named honorable mention all-Big Ten by both the media and the coaches, his four forced fumbles were fourth in the Big Ten and his seven sacks ranked eighth in the Big Ten.

Professional career
Mattison was shifted from defensive end to guard in 2009 with the Baltimore Ravens. He spent parts of four seasons with Baltimore, before being waived on November 24, 2011. On November 25, 2011, he was signed by the St. Louis Rams. On September 26, 2012, he was signed by the Kansas City Chiefs. On May 2, 2013 Mattison was released by the Chiefs.

Post playing career
Mattison decided to retire from professional football in the spring of 2013, and turned down an opportunity to tryout for the Carolina Panthers. He spent the 2013 fall season serving as a volunteer assistant football coach at Penn High School, his alma mater in his hometown of Mishawaka.

References

External links

 Kansas City Chiefs bio
 Iowa Hawkeyes bio
 ESPN bio

1984 births
Living people
American football defensive ends
Iowa Hawkeyes football players
New York Jets players
Baltimore Ravens players
St. Louis Rams players
Kansas City Chiefs players
Sportspeople from Kalamazoo, Michigan
People from Mishawaka, Indiana